Together for Short Lives is the UK registered charity for children's palliative care. Together for Short Lives’ vision is for children and young people in the UK with life-limiting and life-threatening conditions and their families to have as fulfilling lives as possible, and the best care at the end of life.

Together for Short Lives is a registered charity in England and Wales (1144022) and Scotland (SC044139) and is a company limited by guarantee (7783702).

Together for Short Lives' president is Professor Sir Alan Craft, and Vice President is Dr Ann Goldman.  Its patrons include: Simon Cowell, Dame Elizabeth Fradd DBE, FRCN, Rosa Monckton, Mason Mount, John Overton and Holly Willoughby. Rebecca Front is an ambassador for the charity, along with Alex Corbisiero and Lucy Watts MBE.

History
Together for Short Lives was launched as a new UK charity on 1 November 2011.

Together for Short Lives was developed as the new name for ACT & Children's Hospices UK, which merged in October 2011. Prior to merger ACT and Children's Hospices UK were two UK registered charities working within children's palliative care and offering membership services to children's hospice services, children's palliative care professionals and families.

ACT and Children's Hospices UK merged on 1 October 2011 to become one voice for children's palliative care in the UK.

ACT (Association for Children with life-threatening and Terminal conditions) was established in 1988 under the direction of Professor David Baum, at the Institute of Child Health, Bristol and Sister Frances Dominica founder of Helen House hospice for children in Oxford.

ACT was established to develop an information service for families and professionals supporting them; to develop a national network for children's palliative care and to co-ordinate statutory and voluntary services concerned with delivering palliative care to children and families.

Children's Hospices UK (previously known as ACH) was established in 1998 as a national umbrella charity working with independent children's hospices across the UK. It was established to provide a national voice for children's hospices by raising awareness, improving statutory funding of hospices, and to foster collaboration between children's hospice services and to help develop professional practice.

Both ACT and Children's Hospices UK were based in Bristol, UK and had a history of working collaboratively on awareness raising and lobbying, prior to merger in 2011.

Membership and Services

Together for Short Lives is an umbrella charity for services and professionals working across children's palliative care. It offers membership to organisations, including the children's hospice and palliative care services and professionals who provide care and support to babies, children and young people with life-limiting and life-threatening conditions and their families.

It offers membership and support to families and runs a UK helpline called the Together for Families Helpline.

In December 2014 Together for Short Lives launched an animation called We’re Having a Baby to communicate the needs of families when they hear the news of their child's diagnosis and also to reassure families that there are specialist children's palliative care services to support them.

The charity provides information and support to families and professionals working across children's palliative care. Together for Short Lives has developed a care pathway approach to delivering care and support to children and families and has published a series of resources to support this including a Core Care Pathway for Children with Life-limiting and Life-threatening Conditions and a Family Companion.

Together for Short Lives’ activity is informed by the needs of children and young people with palliative care need and their families, and by the experience of children's hospice and palliative care services. The charity has an established Parent Carer Advisory Group.

In 2012 Together for Short Lives published a report called Square Table – Local learning and evaluation report which captured the findings of a national listening tour of 42 'square table' events held across England, Scotland and Northern Ireland throughout 2011. More than 1,500 people took part in these events – including families of children with life-limiting and life-threatening conditions, young people who have grown up using children's palliative care services, health, social care and education professionals and other representatives from across the community.

They were designed to provide insight into the lives of children and their families as well as an opportunity to understand the perspective of a wide range of professionals who support them.

Lobbying and awareness raising

The charity lobbies and raises funds for children's hospice services and voluntary sector organisations through a national fundraising scheme and corporate partnerships. Together for Short Lives raises awareness of children's palliative care and the needs of children with life-limiting and life-threatening conditions. The charity lobbies governments and influences policy for children's palliative care in all four UK nations.

The charity runs an annual fundraising and awareness raising week called Children’s Hospice Week. Since 2011, Together for Short Lives has benefited from the proceeds of sales of The X Factor charity and winner's singles.

Together for Short Lives had been one of the ITV Text Santa charities for two years since the show's inception, benefitting in 2012 and 2014, raising money for UK children's hospices. Together for Short Lives also works internationally through its close collaboration with the International Children’s Palliative Care Network (ICPCN) by sharing resources and information to help the children's palliative care sector across the globe.

On 3 June 2015 Patron Simon Cowell hosted the first Together for Short Lives Midsummer Ball at Banqueting House in support of seriously ill children and their families. Marvin and Rochelle Humes hosted the night's entertainment, introducing performances from Ronnie Scott's Jazz Orchestra, Katie Melua, Stephen Mulhern, Britain's Got Talent 2014 finalists Jack Pack and Britain's Got Talent 2015 finalist Isaac Waddington. The night culminated with a DJ set from Grammy award-winning music producer William Orbit.

From February 2022, Together for Short Lives is the official charity partner of UK supermarket Morrisons, a partnership which will run for three years.

Children’s Hospice Week
Run by Together for Short Lives, Children’s Hospice Week is the UK's only awareness raising and fundraising week for children with life-threatening and life-limiting conditions and the services, like children's hospices, that support them.

Children's Hospice Week 2014 saw Together for Short Lives patrons Simon Cowell and Holly Willoughby launch #WeCare247 – a campaign to highlight the round the clock care that seriously ill children require and the services, like children's hospices, that are there to support them.

Children's Hospice Week 2015 focused on ‘Making every moment count’ to raise awareness of how precious time is for families caring for a seriously ill child and how services support families to make the most of their time together. The Duchess of Cambridge offered a message of support for Children's Hospice Week 2015 and the campaign was backed by a host of celebrities including Louis Walsh, Alex Corbisiero, Ben Haenow, Rebecca Front, Kate Silverton, Dave Berry and Ben Hanlin, as well as patrons Holly Willoughby and Simon Cowell.

Research
In 2011, Together for Short Lives commissioned research on the number of children and young people with life-limiting and life-threatening conditions in the UK who may require palliative care. The research shows that there are 49,000 children and young people with life-limiting and life-threatening conditions in the UK.

In 2010, the Transition Partnership (a collaboration between Together for Short Lives, Hospice UK and the National Council for Palliative Care) working with researchers at the University of York was funded by the Big Lottery Research Programme to conduct the STEPP Project (supporting health transitions for young people with life-limiting conditions: researching evidence positive practice). The research was published in 2013.

In 2013, Together for Short Lives published the BIG Study, a two-year research project undertaken with five university partners, funded by the Big Lottery Fund Research Programme. The Study explored how well the needs of life-limited children were being met in the West Midlands.

References

External links
 Together for Short Lives website

2011 establishments in the United Kingdom
Children's charities based in the United Kingdom
Health charities in the United Kingdom
Palliative care in the United Kingdom
Youth charities based in the United Kingdom